Government Complex No. 1 is a closed complex of government buildings located at the center of Pyongyang, the capital of North Korea. It houses the headquarters of the Workers' Party of Korea and the State Affairs Commission, the country's ruling party and supreme state organ, respectively. The complex is situated roughly between Changgwang, Chollima, and Hebangsan streets. It contains a number of administrative buildings as well as apartment buildings surrounded by a wall. The secure nature of the complex has led some commentators to describe it as "Pyongyang's Forbidden City".

Overview
The complex includes the seat of the secretariat and the central meeting hall of the Workers' Party of Korea. It was reported in October 2019 that many high-rise windows facing the complex had been blocked out for security. The complex saw large construction activity in 2019. Satellite images showed construction activity between February and April 2020; an old building that was thought to be the private clinic of the North Korean leadership had been torn down and construction had begun on a new, larger building with multiple rooms.

References

Pyongyang
Workers' Party of Korea
Official residences
Headquarters of political parties